Micropentila flavopunctata, the rare brown dots, is a butterfly in the family Lycaenidae. It is found in Nigeria (east and the Cross River loop), Cameroon and the Republic of the Congo. Its habitat consists of primary forests found in those countries.

References

Butterflies described in 1965
Poritiinae